Conus paranobilis is an extinct species of sea snail, a marine gastropod mollusk in the family Conidae, the cone snails, cone shells or cones.

It is the type species of the extinct family Herndliconus Petuch & Drolshagen, 2015

Description

Distribution
This marine species is only known as a fossil from the Okeechobean Sea (Pliocene, Pleistocene).

References

 Petuch E.J., Drolshagen M. & Herndl G. (2015). Cone shells of the Okeechobean Sea (Pliocene, Pleistocene). Harxheim: Conchbooks. 179 pp. page(s): 60

External links
 To World Register of Marine Species

paranobilis